is a Japanese former sports shooter. He competed in two events at the 1972 Summer Olympics.

References

1941 births
Living people
Japanese male sport shooters
Olympic shooters of Japan
Shooters at the 1970 Asian Games
Shooters at the 1972 Summer Olympics
Shooters at the 1974 Asian Games
Place of birth missing (living people)
Asian Games medalists in shooting
Asian Games gold medalists for Japan
Asian Games bronze medalists for Japan
Medalists at the 1970 Asian Games
Medalists at the 1974 Asian Games
20th-century Japanese people